The High Commissioner of Grenada to the United Kingdom is Grenada's foremost diplomatic representative in the United Kingdom of Great Britain and Northern Ireland.

Countries belonging to the Commonwealth of Nations typically exchange High Commissioners, rather than Ambassadors. Though there are a few technical differences (for instance, whereas Ambassadors present their diplomatic credentials to the host country's head of state, High Commissioners are accredited to the head of government), they are in practice one and the same office. The following persons have served as Grenadian High Commissioner to the United Kingdom.

List of heads of mission

High Commissioners to the United Kingdom

Oswald Moxley Gibbs, 1974-1978 
Raymond Anthony, 1979  
Fennis Augustine, 1979-1983 
Oswald Moxley Gibbs, 1984-1990 
Lynton Noel, 1990-1992 
Maureen Emmanuel, 1992-1995 
June Lendore, 1995-1996 
Marcelle Gairy, 1997-1998  
Ruth Elizabeth Rouse, 1999-2004 
Joslyn Whiteman, 2004-2005 
Joseph S Charter, 2005-2008
Ruth Elizabeth Rouse, 2008–2013
Joslyn Whiteman, 2013-2016
Karl Hood, 2016-2018
Kisha Alexander-Grant, 2018-Present

References

External links 
High Commission for Grenada to the United Kingdom

United Kingdom, List of High Commissioners from Grenada to the
High Commissioners from Grenada to the United Kingdom
Grenada